Foreign relations of Tajikistan are based on a desire to secure foreign investment and promote regional security while ensuring Tajikistan's independence. Sirodjidin Aslov is the current Foreign’s Minister of Tajikistan.

Disputes
Outstanding boundary negotiations include talks begun with Uzbekistan to demine and delimit border; however, disputes in Isfara Valley delay completion of delimitation with Kyrgyzstan.

Diplomatic relations

Bilateral relations

Inter-governmental organisation membership
Tajikistan is a member of the following international organisations:
 United Nations
 World Bank
 International Monetary Fund (IMF)
 Food and Agriculture Organization of the United Nations (FAO)
 Commonwealth of Independent States (CIS)
 Economic Cooperation Organization (ECO)
 Shanghai Cooperation Organisation (SCO)
 Eurasian Economic Community (EUASEC)
 Organisation of Islamic Cooperation (OIC)

See also
 List of diplomatic missions in Tajikistan
 List of diplomatic missions of Tajikistan

References

External links
. State.gov (2010-09-22). Retrieved on 2010-10-21.
 Ministry of Foreign Affairs of Tajikistan